16th New York Film Critics Circle Awards
January 28, 1951(announced December 27, 1950)

All About Eve
The 16th New York Film Critics Circle Awards, honored the best filmmaking of 1950.

Winners
Best Film:
All About Eve
Best Actor:
Gregory Peck - Twelve O'Clock High
Best Actress:
Bette Davis - All About Eve
Best Directors:
Joseph L. Mankiewicz - All About Eve
Best Foreign Language Film:
L'Amore • Italy

References

External links
1950 Awards

1950
New York Film Critics Circle Awards, 1950
1950 in American cinema
1950 in New York City